Duncan Weldon (19 March 1941 – 30 January 2019) was a British theatre producer who won the Tony Award for Best Revival of a Play in 2002 for Private Lives.
From 2005 until his death he was married to Ann Sidney.

References

1941 births
2019 deaths
British theatre managers and producers
Tony Award winners